Wildwood, also known as the Monroe Long House and Taylor Long Homeplace, is a historic home located near Semora, Caswell County, North Carolina. It was built in 1893, and is a two-story, frame "T"-shaped I-house.  It has a two-story rear service wing.  It sits on a brick foundation and is sheathed in weatherboard. It has Queen Anne and Greek Revival style design elements.  Also on the property are a contributing smokehouse (c. 1895) and two original log tobacco barns (c. 1890).

It was added to the National Register of Historic Places in 1986.

References

Houses on the National Register of Historic Places in North Carolina
Greek Revival houses in North Carolina
Queen Anne architecture in North Carolina
Houses completed in 1893
Houses in Caswell County, North Carolina
National Register of Historic Places in Caswell County, North Carolina